Gentile da Fabriano ( – 1427) was an Italian painter known for his participation in the International Gothic painter style. He worked in various places in central Italy, mostly in Tuscany. His best-known works are his Adoration of the Magi from the Strozzi Altarpiece (1423), and the Flight into Egypt. Following a visit to Florence in the 1419, he came in contact with humanism, which influenced his work throughout the rest of his career. He became highly influential for other painters in Florence, especially because of his use of detail based on the observations he made of the natural world.

Bibliography

Early life in Fabriano (c. 1370-1400) 
Gentile (di Niccolò di Massio) da Fabriano was born around 1370 in or near Fabriano, in the Marche. Despite having several family members who took part in different civic and religious organizations in the city, much of Gentile's early life remains undocumented. His mother died some point before 1380, and his father, Niccolò di Giovanni Massi, retired to a monastery in the same year, where he later died in 1385. Little is known of his educational formation: one of his first known works, a Madonna and Child (c. 1395–1400, now in Berlin) shows the influence of paintings made in the northern Italian late-Gothic style. Around 1390 Pavia resided at the court of Gian Galeazzo Visconti, where there is a table with the Madonna with the Children together with the saints Clara and Francis (now in the Pavia Civic Museums) and some frescoes depicting ladies inside a room of the Visconti Castle.

Venice (c. 1405–1420) 
By around 1405, Gentile da Fabriano was working in Venice. He painted a panel for the church of Santa Sofia, now lost; Jacopo Bellini worked perhaps in his workshop. Between 1408 and 1409, he painted a fresco (now lost) in the Doge's Palace depicting the naval battle between the Venetians and Otto III. In Venice, he knew Pisanello and perhaps Michelino da Besozzo. He also produced commissions for other cities during this period, such as his Madonna and Child (c. 1405–1410) for a church in Perugia.

In 1410–1411, Gentile was in Foligno, where he frescoed some of the walls of the Palazzo Trinci. Gentile met painter Michelino da Besozzo in Venice and became inspired by his rhythmic and sophisticated style. Around 1410–1412, he painted one of his first masterworks, the Valle Romita Polyptych (now at the Pinacoteca di Brera). The altarpiece was probably commissioned by Chiavello Chiavelli upon its completion in 1412. In 1414, he moved to Brescia, at the service of Pandolfo III Malatesta, and painted the Broletto Chapel, a work now mostly lost, for the next five years. While in Brescia in 1418, Gentile painted another panel that was later given as a gift to Pope Martin V, who had passed through the city on his way to Rome.

Florence 
On 6 August 1420, Gentile was in Florence, where he painted his famous altarpiece depicting the Adoration of the Magi (1423) commissioned by Palla Strozzi. This work, which is now in the Uffizi, is regarded as one of the masterpieces of the International Gothic style and had a lasting influence on Italian Renaissance painting. This work also demonstrated his improved naturalistic technique that used light to create dimensions and perspective.  His use of contrasting light brought the figures to life, making them appear more naturalistic human. His other works in Florence include the Intercession Altarpiece (1420–1423) and the Quaratesi Polyptych (May 1425). In June–August 1425, he was in Siena, where he painted a Madonna with Child, now lost, for the Palazzo dei Notai in Piazza del Campo. Between August 1425 and October of the same year, he was in Orvieto, where he painted his fresco of the Madonna and Child in the Cathedral, where it still remains today. The work has, however, been restored since its original painting. Also sometime between 1420 and 1425, Gentile painted another work, an Annunciation, in the Vatican Pinacoteca. This painting contains a number of unique features and uses light to visualize the ut vitrum metaphor, which creates glass-like images. Gentile also demonstrates this technique in the predella. The Nativity scene contains three different sources of light (the moon, the angel above and the Christ child) to form the first realistic depiction of night in Renaissance art.

Rome (1427) 
In 1427 Gentile arrived in Rome. There, he was commissioned by Pope Martin V to decorate the nave of the Basilica of St. John in Lateran. However, Gentile is known to have died later in the year sometime before 14 October 1427. The nave would later be completed by Pisanello after Gentile's death. Gentile is commonly said to have been buried in the church now called S. Francesca Romana in Florence, but his tomb vanished; there is evidence, however, that he may be buried in the church of Santa Maria in Trastevere, in Rome.

Islamic Influence: Mamluk Metalwork 

The Mamluk Sultanate is well-known for its production of metalwork objects, most of which include inscriptions in Arabic script. By the late thirteenth century, artists like Duccio and then later in the early fifteenth century, Gentile da Fabriano, were influenced by these types of Mamluk metalwork pieces and started to incorporate their patterns and motifs into their paintings. In Gentiles da Fabriano's Adoration of the Magi (1423), pseudo-Kufic Inscriptions line the cloaks of several figures. Pseudo-kufic inscriptions also appear in the bold, ornamented halo of the Virgin Mary and Joseph, which are divided into four equal parts by rosettes, are also seen in the Mamluk plates. An example of a Mamluk plate of the time is the Mamluk Philae Dish (c. 1345–1360), where four rossetts divide the Arabic script into quadrants.

Halos with pseudo-kufic inscriptions are reflected in several of Gentile da Fabriano's paintings that were produced during his time in Florence including: Coronation of the Virgin (Gentile da Fabriano) from around 1420 and a Madonna with Child and Angels that is part of the Quaratesi Polyptych (May 1425). Moreover, Gentile da Fabriano's use of halos with pseudo-kufic inscriptions influenced other artists, including painter Masaccio, who began his use of pseudo-kufic halos as early as 1422, and can be seen later in his Pisa Altarpiece from 1426. Venice was among the early important centers of trade for Islamic goods in Europe, and in turn, traditional Islamic forms were highly desired by European patrons because of their associations with "exotic" Other of Jerusalem and the Holy Land. Halos painted with patterns based on Mamluk metalworks reveal the types of commercial and artistic exchanges that were taking place in other Italian city-states, like Florence. The fact that Florence secured two major seaports, Pisa and Livorno, in 1406 and 1421 respectively, illustrates the increased diplomatic ties between the Florentines and Mamluks.

Notes

References

Sources
 
  Exposition lasting 21 April–23 July 2006.

External links

 Gentile da Fabriano biography-paintings-curiosity-publications
 Italian Paintings: Sienese and Central Italian Schools, a collection catalog containing information about Fabriano and his works (see index; plates 34-35).
 5 paintings of Gentile da Fabriano 
 Gentile da Fabriano at the National Gallery of Art, Washington DC

1370s births
1427 deaths
People from Fabriano
14th-century Italian painters
Italian male painters
15th-century Italian painters
Gothic painters
Catholic painters